Statistics of Football League First Division in the 1969–70 season.

Overview
Everton won the First Division title for the seventh time in the club's history that season. They made sure of that on 1 April, with a 2–0 win over West Bromwich Albion at Goodison Park. Sheffield Wednesday went down on 22 April, after losing 2–1 at home to Manchester City whilst Sunderland had gone 7 days earlier, losing 1–0 at home to Liverpool (a win would have saved them from relegation at the expense of Crystal Palace).

League standings

Results

Managerial changes

Top scorers

References

RSSSF

Football League First Division seasons
Eng
1969–70 Football League
1969–70 in English football leagues